The 2017 FIBA Africa Under-16 Championship for Women was the 5th FIBA Africa U16 Championship for Women, played under the rules of FIBA, the world governing body for basketball, and the FIBA Africa thereof. The tournament was hosted by Mozambique from August 5 to 12, with the games played in Beira.

Mali claimed their record fifth straight continental title by trouncing Angola in the Finals, 68–29. Both teams will represent FIBA Africa to the 2018 FIBA Under-17 Women’s Basketball World Cup.

Hosts Selection
On 25 March 2016, FIBA Africa announced that Mozambique will host the tournament.

Venue

Qualification

Squads

Participating teams

Format
The first round will be played in a round-robin format. The top four teams will advance to the Final Phase which will be played in a knockout format (Semi-Finals, Final).
The Third-Place Game and the Final will be played on the last day of the tournament (August 12).

Group phase
All times are in Central Africa Time (UTC+2:00)

Final round
Finalists qualified for the 2018 FIBA Under-17 Women’s Basketball World Cup.

Semi-finals

Bronze medal match

Final

Statistical Leaders 
Final statistics at the end of the tournament:

Players 

Points

Rebounds

Assists

Blocks

Steals

Other statistical leaders

Awards 

 Most Valuable Player:  Aissetou Coulibaly
The All-Star Five:

Final ranking

Notes

References

External links
Official Website

FIBA Africa Under-16 Championship for Women
2017 in African basketball
2017 in women's basketball
FIBA
2017 in youth sport
International women's basketball competitions hosted by Mozambique